Mathieu Salamand (born 17 April 1991) is a French Professional football player who plays for Olympique lyonnais in the Futsal Team.

Mathieu is born in Lyon (France) and made his formation at Olympique Lyonnais from 2004 to 2010 before leaving in Switzerland to the Swiss Super League club, FC Thun (D1). After 4 years and a participation to the Europa League during season 2013/14, Mathieu was transferred to FC Biel/Bienne in Challenge League (D2).

References

External links
Mathieu Salamand profile at football.ch

French footballers
Swiss Super League players
Swiss Challenge League players
FC Thun players
FC Biel-Bienne players
French expatriate footballers
Expatriate footballers in Switzerland
1991 births
Living people
Association football midfielders